The brown-capped laughingthrush (Trochalopteron austeni) is a species of bird in the family Leiothrichidae. It is found in the Patkai range, where its natural habitat is subtropical and tropical moist montane forests.

References

brown-capped laughingthrush
Birds of Northeast India
Birds of Myanmar
brown-capped laughingthrush
Taxonomy articles created by Polbot